László Tóth (born 2 June 2000) is a Hungarian racing driver who most recently competed for Charouz Racing System in the 2022 FIA Formula 3 Championship, having previously competed with Campos Racing the previous year. He previously competed in the Italian F4 Championship, ADAC Formula 4 and Formula Renault Eurocup.

Personal life 
He is a polyglot: aside from his native Hungarian, he fluently speaks English, French, German and Dutch.

Early career

Karting 
He started racing in 2013, learning the basics of racing in karting. He first raced go-karts in Hungary and then competed in the German Championship and Euro Challenge. He later competed in the European and World Karting Championships, with his greatest success of his karting career being third place in the Hungarian championship and Rotax Max Wintercup in 2016 respectively. He ended 48th in the 2017 CIK-FIA Karting European Championship.

Lower formulae

2018 
Tóth made his racing debut during the fourth round of the 2017-18 Formula 4 UAE Championship at the Yas Marina Circuit, competing as a guest driver and achieving a high of ninth place. In 2018, he contested the first three race weekends of the Italian F4 Championship for DR Motorsport, achieving a best finish of 18th and ending 41st in the standings. During the season, he changed to MP Motorsport, contesting five of the six rounds of the F4 Spanish Championship, where he finished eleventh in the overall points standings, having scored 47 points.

2019 
In the 2019 season, he competed in ADAC Formula 4 in Germany for the R-ace GP team. Tóth came close to scoring points on several occasions but only managed to do so once at the last round in Sachsenring. Tóth ended 20th in the standings. He also competed in the Italian F4 Championship in three rounds but did not score any points. At the end of the season, he competed in the FIA Motorsport Games representing Team Hungary, and claimed seventh place.

Formula Renault Eurocup 
In February 2020, Bhaitech announced that they had signed the Hungarian driver for the final Formula Renault Eurocup season. In the second race of the season, Tóth finished eighth in the points but was subsequently moved up a place through a penalty for Petr Ptáček, who had finished ahead of him, and ended up in seventh place. He scored two more points finishes that season and ended up 16th in the standings.

FIA Formula 3 Championship

2021 

On 24 March 2021, Campos Racing announced the signing of Tóth for the 2021 season of the Formula 3 Championship on a one-year contract with an optional extension. In the opening weekend in Barcelona, Tóth finished 27th, 23rd and 26th. A few days before the second round of the season, Tóth tested positive for COVID-19, thus ruling him out of racing that weekend. The Hungarian returned for the round in Spielberg, where he scored his season-best finish of 19th in the first race. At the following round in his native Hungary, Tóth was involved in a collision with Ido Cohen in the final race. Following another pointless weekend in Belgium, Tóth managed to achieve his best result of the season at the penultimate round of the season, finishing 16th in race 2 at Zandvoort. Unfortunately for the Hungarian, his final weekend of the season in Sochi ended without a finish in the top twenty. Tóth finished his campaign 32nd in the standings, ahead of only three part-time competitors.

2022 

Following the end of the season, Tóth tested with Charouz Racing System in all three days of the post-season test in Valencia. On 25 January 2022, the Czech team announced that Tóth would race with the team in the 2022 FIA Formula 3 Championship, stating that he felt "more relaxed" on his second season. Tóth's results did not improve; he only had a best finish of 19th three times while finishing 37th at the end of the championship, the lowest of all full-time drivers.

Sportscar career

2023: Move to LMP2 
Tóth transitioned to sportscar racing at the start of 2023, driving for ARC Bratislava in the LMP2 class of the Asian Le Mans Series.

Karting record

Karting career summary

Complete CIK-FIA Karting European Championship results 
(key) (Races in bold indicate pole position) (Races in italics indicate fastest lap)

Racing record

Racing career summary 

† As Tóth was a guest driver, he was ineligible to score points.

Complete F4 Spanish Championship results 
(key) (Races in bold indicate pole position) (Races in italics indicate fastest lap)

Complete Italian F4 Championship results 
(key) (Races in bold indicate pole position) (Races in italics indicate fastest lap)

Complete ADAC Formula 4 Championship results 
(key) (Races in bold indicate pole position) (Races in italics indicate fastest lap)

Complete FIA Motorsport Games results

Complete Formula Renault Eurocup results 
(key) (Races in bold indicate pole position) (Races in italics indicate fastest lap)

Complete FIA Formula 3 Championship results 
(key) (Races in bold indicate pole position; races in italics indicate points for the fastest lap of top ten finishers)

Complete Asian Le Mans Series results 
(key) (Races in bold indicate pole position) (Races in italics indicate fastest lap)

References

External links 
  (in Hungarian)
 

Living people
Sportspeople from Pest County
2000 births
Hungarian racing drivers
FIA Formula 3 Championship drivers
Target Racing drivers
MP Motorsport drivers
R-ace GP drivers
Bhaitech drivers
Campos Racing drivers
Formula Renault Eurocup drivers
ADAC Formula 4 drivers
Italian F4 Championship drivers
SMP F4 Championship drivers
Spanish F4 Championship drivers
Charouz Racing System drivers
FIA Motorsport Games drivers
UAE F4 Championship drivers
Asian Le Mans Series drivers